Michel Anglade is a French former rugby union and league player.

Rugby union career

Club level 
Before switching to rugby league, Anglade played for Tarbes between 1967 and 1972, playing as flanker, with said team, he reached the semi-final of the 1967-68 French Rugby Union Championship against Lourdes in Bordeaux.

Rugby league career 
In 1972, Anglade switched codes to rugby league, joining Saint-Gaudens, where he played as lock forward between 1972 and 1976, with which he won the French Rugby League Championship in 1974 against US Villeneuve by 21–8. He also represented his country at the 1972 and 1975 Rugby League World Cups.

Clubs 
 Saint-Gaudens (1972-1976)

Club honours 
 French Champion in 1974-75 (Saint-Gaudens)

International level 
 7 caps for France 1972–1975, against :
 New Zealand : 1972, 1975,
 Australia : 1972,
 England : 1975,
 Wales : 1975.

References

External links 
Michel Anglade at rugbyleagueproject.org

Living people
Date of birth unknown
France national rugby league team players
French rugby league players
French rugby union players
Rugby league locks
Rugby union flankers
Saint-Gaudens Bears players
Year of birth missing (living people)
Tarbes Pyrénées Rugby players
People from Auch
Sportspeople from Gers